"Ai to Hate" (English: Love and Hate) is the third  EP released by Nana Kitade. It was released under the German label, Spark & Shine. It is described as "a mini-album with 5 brand new tracks in which Nana Kitade goes beyond the cultural boundaries of J-Rock, while artistically reinventing herself in the process".

Track listing

Personnel
 Nana Kitade – Vocals, Lyrics
 Taizo – Guitar

References

2011 EPs
Pop music EPs
EPs by Japanese artists
Japanese-language EPs